The West Ham station attack was a bombing and shooting attack at West Ham station in east London on 15 March 1976. A  bomb on a Metropolitan line train exploded prematurely in the front carriage of the train, injuring seven passengers. The bomb detonated prior to reaching the City of London, where it was thought the intended target was Liverpool Street station at rush hour. Adrian Vincent Donnelly, a Provisional Irish Republican Army (IRA) member, then shot Post Office engineer Peter Chalk in the chest, and killed train driver Julius Stephen, who had attempted to catch him. Donelly exited the station to the street and threatened people with his revolver before PC Raymond Kiff caught up with him. Shouting "You English bastards!", Donelly shot himself in the chest, but he survived and was apprehended by Kiff.

Perpetrator
Adrian Donelly, 36 at the time, was originally from Castlefin, County Donegal, in the Republic of Ireland but lived in London from 1971. He was part of an active service unit involved in planting 16 bombs. In 1977 at the Old Bailey, he was convicted of murder and attempted murder. He was sentenced to life imprisonment by Mr Justice Croom-Johnson with a minimum of 30 years. He was released after 21 years in August 1998 as one of the earliest beneficiaries of the Good Friday Agreement's prisoner release scheme. He died on 25 August 2019.

Aftermath
Eleven days prior, an IRA bomb had exploded in a train at Cannon Street station. The day after the West Ham attack, a bomb on a train at Wood Green tube station exploded, injuring a man. On 17 March, a  bomb was discovered in a train at Neasden Depot. After these events, London Transport launched a security operation and assigned 1,000 plainclothed policemen on the London Underground system.

An appeal to raise money was launched for the family of the driver of the train, Julius Stephen, who left behind a widow and a family. £17,000 had been raised by August 1976.

See also
Cannon Street train bombing
1976 Olympia bombing
Bombings of King's Cross and Euston stations
Bombings of Paddington and Victoria stations
Provisional Irish Republican Army campaign 1969–1997

References

1976 in London
1976 murders in the United Kingdom
1970s crimes in London
Attacks on buildings and structures in London
Attacks on railway stations in Europe
Explosions in 1976
History of the London Borough of Newham
March 1976 crimes
March 1976 events in Europe
Murder in London
Provisional IRA bombings in London
Terrorist incidents in the United Kingdom in 1976
Terrorist incidents on railway systems in the United Kingdom
Train bombings in Europe
Station attack
Building bombings in London